Sunday Services is a modern revision of the Anglican Book of Common Prayer produced by the Diocese of Sydney in Australia in response to the theological patterns displayed in recent revisions. The book is designed to preserve the reformed theology of the 1662 Book of Common Prayer, but in more accessible modern language.

External links
 Sunday Services on the Diocese of Sydney website

Anglican Church of Australia
Book of Common Prayer
Australian non-fiction literature

Anglican liturgical books